The Pan American Fencing Championships are an annual top-level fencing tournament organized by the Pan American Fencing Confederation. They serve as zone championships for the Fencing World Cup run by the International Fencing Federation.

Editions

Medals (2006-2019)

Pan American Cadets and Juniors Fencing Championships
Pan American Cadets and Juniors Fencing Championships

2016 Pan American Cadets and Juniors Fencing Championships - 
2017 Pan American Cadets and Juniors Fencing Championships - 
2018 Pan American Cadets and Juniors Fencing Championships - 
2019 Pan American Cadets and Juniors Fencing Championships - 
2020 Pan American Cadets and Juniors Fencing Championships - 
2022 Pan American Cadets and Juniors Fencing Championships - 
2023 Pan American Cadets and Juniors Fencing Championships - Bogotá, 

2021 Pan American Cadets and Juniors Fencing Championships - Not held

See also
 Fencing at the Summer Olympics
 World Fencing Championships
 other zone championships: African Fencing Championships, Asian Fencing Championships, European Fencing Championships

References
 Results and statistics at the International Fencing Federation

 
International sports championships in the Americas
Fencing competitions
Fencing competitions in North America
Fencing competitions in South America
Fencing
Recurring sporting events established in 2006